The Cottesloe School, formerly known as Wing County Secondary School, is a co-educational secondary school located on the outskirts of Wing, Buckinghamshire, England.  It occupies a large rural site with views of the countryside in one direction and overlooking Wing village and its Saxon church in the other.  The school takes children from the age of eleven through to the age of eighteen.  The school has 1300 students, of which over 170 are in the Sixth Form.  The school serves a large rural catchment in the north of Buckinghamshire, as well as parts of Bedfordshire and Hertfordshire.  Since 2009 the school has been oversubscribed at Year 7.

The previous Ofsted report in 2009 stated; “A high proportion of parents responded to the parental questionnaire. The majority are positive about the work of the school, in particular the recent improvements. Parents value the support provided by the school for students.”

History
The Cottesloe School has grown rapidly.  Work on the dining room and its kitchens were completed in February 2011. A £3m Sports Hall and new classroom block facilities had been created and fully finished by 2016. Leaving a much more spacious facility for the drama students.

Sixth Form
In 2005 fewer than 70 students attended the Sixth Form but in 2010 there were over 170 on roll. This has impacted on facilities but with the new dining hall in place as of February 2011, more space has been freed up.

Each year there is a Head Boy, Head Girl and Deputies appointed and these help constitute the Sixth Form Committee.  Other members include the Head Boy and Head Girl, plus two deputies, from each of the four Houses (Austen, Churchill, Nightingale and Shakespeare).

Specialism
In September 2006 the school was awarded Specialist Status as an arts college, by the Department for Education and Skills. The specialism is in the Arts, made up of Art and Photography, Drama and English. This was re-designated in July 2010. The specialist schools programme has now ended, however the school continues to offer the Arts as a specialism.

Working with the local community
The school has worked closely with feeder schools, providing support through its Arts Specialism.  Two local feeder schools were involved in the productions of ‘Joseph' and the performance of ‘Oliver' (Dec 2010). As part of their Sixth Form study, students participate in an Enrichment Programme.  For the last three years, this has involved students working with MacIntyre School and Carey Lodge, Wing.

External links
School website
Cottesloe Virtual Learning Environment
Department for Education Performance Tables 2011
BBC News Text Mentoring

Secondary schools in Buckinghamshire
Foundation schools in Buckinghamshire